Maipure (Maypure, Mejepure), was a language once spoken along the Ventuari, Sipapo, and Autana rivers of Amazonas and, as a lingua franca, in the Upper Orinoco region. It became extinct around the end of the eighteenth century. Zamponi provided a grammatical sketch of the language and furnished a classified word list, based on all of its extant eighteenth century material (mainly from the Italian missionary Filippo S. Gilij). It is historically important in that it formed the cornerstone of the recognition of the Maipurean (Arawakan) language family.

Kaufman (1994) gives its closest relatives as Yavitero and other languages of the Orinoco branch of Upper Amazon Arawakan. Aikhenvald places it instead in the Western Nawiki branch.

Notes and references

Arawakan languages
Indigenous languages of the South American Northeast